Le Secret (literally "The secret" in French) may refer to:

Le Secret (film) or The Secret, a 1974 film
Le Secret (album), a 2013 album by Lara Fabian
Le Secret (EP), a 2005 EP by French musician Alcest

See also
Secret (disambiguation)